This is a list of firsts in Thailand.

Education 
 First University: Chulalongkorn University, founded in 1917.
 First public secondary school: Suankularb Wittayalai School, founded in 1882.
 First textbook of the Thai language: Chindamani, Written during King Narai's reign (1656-1688)

Energy 

 First multi-purpose hydroelectric dam: Bhumibol Dam, finished in 1964.
 First time electricity was generated in Thailand: Chakri Maha Prasat Throne Hall, 1884

Exploration 
 First Thai to reach the peak of Mount Everest: Withitnan Rojanapanich, 2008.
 First Thai to reach Antarctica: Princess Sirindhorn, 1993

Military 

 First submarines in the Royal Siamese Navy: Matchanu-class submarine, all 4 ships are commissioned in 1938.
 First aircraft carrier in the Royal Thai Navy: HTMS Chakri Naruebet, commissioned in 1997.

Politics and government 
 First major Tai kingdom: Sukhothai Kingdom: 1238–1438
First monarch of the Chakri Dynasty: Rama I: 6 April, 1782 – 7 September, 1809.

 First Prime Minister: Phraya Manopakorn Nititada: 28 June, 1932- 20 June, 1933.
 First female Prime Minister: Yingluck Shinawatra: 5 August, 2011- 7 May, 2014.
First political party: Progressive Party, founded in 1945.
 First successful coup against the constitutional government: 1933 Siamese coup d'état, 1933.
First and only naval officer to serve as prime minister: Thawan Thamrongnawasawat, 1946.

Sports

Olympics 
 First Olympic games where Thailand participated: 1952 Summer Olympics, 1952.
First Thai Olympic medalist: Payao Poontarat (Boxing), Also the first Thai bronze Olympic medalist, 1976.
 First Thai gold Olympic Medalist: Somluck Kamsing (Boxing), 1996
 First Thai silver Olympic Medalist: Dhawee Umponmaha (Boxing), 1984.

Asian Games 
 First Asian Games held in Thailand: 1966 Asian Games, 1966.

Transportation 
 First road built using modern construction methods: Chaoroen Krung road, opened in 1864.
 First railway line, first electric railway service: Paknam Railway, established in 1893, electrified in 1959
 First airport: Don Mueng International Airport, opened in 1914. Also regarded as the oldest airport in Asia.
 First car imported to Thailand: Imported by the royal family, 1900s.
First flight demonstration in Siam: Henry Farman Biplane flown by Charles Van Den Born, 1911 
First bridge across the lower Mekong, First Thai–Lao Friendship Bridge, opened in 1994.

Others 
 First zoo: Dusit zoo, Bangkok, opened in 1938.
First national park: Khao Yai National Park, established in 1962.
 First coastal national park of Thailand: Khao Sam Roi Yot National Park, established in 1966.

See also 
 List of records of Thailand

References 

Thailand
Firsts